The 2011 Taça Digicel season was the second edition of Taça Digicel. Ad. Dili Leste was the defending champion in this season.

Digicel continued its participation as the competition's main sponsor. Adidas as the official athletic sponsor and product supplier for TAÇA Digicel through 2021.

Prize money
The record prize money pool of US$10,000 is broken down as follows :

Teams

Teams summaries

Stadia and locations

Personnel and kits

Note: Flags indicate national team as has been defined under FIFA eligibility rules. Players and Managers may hold more than one non-FIFA nationality.

Managerial changes

League table and result

Group A

Group B

Group C

Top goalscorers

References

External links
 DIGICEL website

2011
Taca